Epipactis leptochila, the narrow-lipped helleborine, is a species of orchid in the genus Epipactis. Found in chalk or limestone-based beech and hornbeam woodland in southern England, the orchids are also found with birch and alder trees in Scotland and the north of England. The narrow-lipped helleborine blooms from early June to mid-August. Epipactis leptochila is also found in parts of northern Europe (away from the coastline) but it is known for its presence in England. Due to woodland clearing, the orchids are becoming less common.

During field observations in 2017–2019, it was identified in the Northeastern part of Romania, in Uricani forest and in Bârnova-Repedea forest (Iași County). In both places, vegetation develops on soils that have been built on a limestone substrate. The species grows in phytocoenoses belonging to the Natura 2000 habitat type 91Y0 - Dacian oak-hornbeam forests. E. leptochila was recorded in small populations (with a small number of individuals) in both forests.

References 

 https://web.archive.org/web/20101225174228/http://www.first-nature.com/flowers/epipactis_leptochila.php
 Irimia I., Postolache, A., New Data for the Distribution of Epipactis Leptochila (Godfery) Godfery in Romania, Analele Ştiinţifice ale Universităţii „Al. I. Cuza” Iaşi, s. II a. Biologie vegetală, 2020, 66: 5–12. Available on-line at http://www.bio.uaic.ro/publicatii/anale_vegetala/issue/2020/01-2020.pdf, accessed on 18 December 2020.
 European Nature Information System (EUNIS), Factsheet for Dacian oak & hornbeam forests, available online at https://eunis.eea.europa.eu/habitats/10268, accessed on 18 December 2020.

leptochila
Orchids of Europe